Muneko Otani is an American violinist at the Mannes College The New School for Music whose CDs were published by E1 Music, Albany, Naxos, New World, Tzadik, and Composers Recordings, Inc. which were named as the best by The New Yorker magazine. She have studied violin at the Toho Gakuen School of Music under guidance from Toshiya Eto and did graduate work with Masuko Ushioda and Louis Krasner at the New England Conservatory. Later on she performed at such places as the Tanglewood Music and Kennedy Centers and even played at the Library of Congress and Parisian Théâtre des Champs-Élysées. She also worked as an assistant at Yale University in Tokyo String Quartet and is currently a teacher at both the University of Columbia and the Mannes College.

References

Living people
American violinists
New England Conservatory alumni
Columbia University faculty
Year of birth missing (living people)
21st-century violinists